Lowell Palmer Weicker Jr. (born May 16, 1931) is an American politician who served as a U.S. Representative, U.S. Senator, and the 85th Governor of Connecticut. He unsuccessfully sought the Republican nomination for president in 1980. He was known as a Rockefeller Republican in Congress, causing conservative-leaning Republicans to endorse his opponent Joe Lieberman, a New Democrat, in the 1988 Senate election which he subsequently lost. Weicker later left the Republican Party, and became one of the few third-party candidates to be elected to a state governorship in the United States in recent years, doing so on the ticket of A Connecticut Party.

As of 2023, Weicker is the last person to have represented Connecticut in the U.S. Senate as a Republican.

Early life
Weicker was born in Paris, the son of American parents Mary Hastings (née Bickford) and Lowell Palmer Weicker. His grandfather Theodore Weicker was a German immigrant who co-founded the E. R. Squibb corporation. Weicker graduated from the Lawrenceville School (class of 1949), Yale University (1953), and the University of Virginia School of Law (1958).  He began his political career after serving in the United States Army between 1953 and 1955, reaching the rank of first lieutenant.

Career in Congress

Weicker served in the Connecticut State House of Representatives from 1963 to 1969 and as First Selectman of Greenwich, Connecticut before winning election to the U.S. House of Representatives, in 1968 as a Republican. Weicker only served one term in the House before being elected to the U.S. Senate in 1970. Weicker benefited from a split in the Democratic Party in that election. Two-term incumbent Thomas Dodd ran as an independent after losing the Democratic nomination to Joseph Duffey. Ultimately, Weicker won with 41.7 percent of the vote. Dodd finished third, with 266,500 votes–far exceeding Weicker's 86,600-vote margin over Duffey.

Weicker served in the U.S. Senate for three terms, from 1971 to 1989. He gained national attention for his service on the Senate Watergate Committee, where he became the first Republican senator to call for Richard Nixon's resignation. He recalled: "People in Connecticut were very much behind President Nixon, like the rest of the country. They thought he could do no wrong, and when I was in Connecticut, I would get flipped the bird all the time, whether it was on the streets or in the car, for the role that I was playing. After Watergate was over, then the needle goes all the way the other way, and I've got huge favorability ratings." Proving this, Weicker was convincingly reelected in 1976.

In 1980, he made an unsuccessful bid for the Republican nomination for president.

Weicker was a liberal voice in an increasingly conservative Republican Party. For instance, in 1986, Americans for Democratic Action rated Weicker as by far the most liberal Republican in the Senate, and gave him a higher rating than Connecticut's other Senator, Democrat Chris Dodd. He was critical of the increasing influence of the Christian right on the party; he described the separation of church and state as "this country's greatest contribution to world civilization", and the party in 2012 as "swung off so far to the right that no moderate could've survived a primary." Weicker voted in favor of the bill establishing Martin Luther King Jr. Day as a federal holiday and the Civil Rights Restoration Act of 1987 (as well as to override President Reagan's veto). Weicker voted against the nomination of William Rehnquist as Chief Justice of the United States, as well as the nomination of Robert Bork to the U.S. Supreme Court.

Weicker was a strong advocate for the rights of the disabled during his time in Congress, although he ultimately lost his seat before the Americans with Disabilities Act of 1990 passed. In later interviews, Weicker identified his work on the Americans with Disabilities Act, funding the National Oceanic and Atmospheric Administration, increasing the funding for the National Institutes of Health, and funding research into AZT as his proudest achievements in the Senate.

Weicker's tense relations with establishment Republicans may have roots in receiving strong support from Nixon in his 1970 Senate bid, support repaid in the eyes of his critics by a vehement attack on the White House while serving on the Watergate Committee. Later, his relations with the Bush family soured, and Prescott Bush Jr. (the brother of the then Vice President) made a short-lived bid against Weicker to gain the 1982 Republican Senate nomination. His liberalism increasingly alienated Connecticut Republicans, particularly after an effort to prevent the nomination of conservatives to state office, which resulted in a poor showing during the 1986 local elections, and he was defeated in the 1988 Senate election by Joe Lieberman. Lieberman benefited from the support of National Review founder William F. Buckley Jr., and his brother, former New York Senator James Buckley; William F. Buckley ran columns in support of Lieberman and circulated bumper stickers with the slogan, "Does Lowell Weicker Make You Sick?".

Governor
Weicker's political career appeared to be over after his 1988 defeat, and he became a professor at the George Washington University Law School. However, he entered the 1990 gubernatorial election as the candidate of A Connecticut Party, running as a good government candidate and drawing on his coalition of liberal Republicans, moderate Democrats, and independent voters. The early 1990s recession had hit Connecticut hard, worsened by the fall in revenues from traditional sources such as sales tax and corporation tax. Connecticut politics had a tradition at the time of opposition to a state income tax — one had been implemented in 1971 but rescinded after six weeks under public pressure. Weicker initially campaigned on a platform of solving Connecticut's fiscal crisis without implementing an income tax. He won in a three-way race with Republican John G. Rowland and Democrat Bruce Morrison, taking 40% of the vote against Rowland's 37% and Morrison's 20%. Weicker lost Fairfield and New Haven County counties to Rowland, but won eastern Connecticut, drawing especially strong support from the Hartford metro area, where he had been strongly endorsed by the Hartford Courant and by many state employee labor unions. The Los Angeles Times wrote that support from Democrats was credited for Weicker's victory, reflected in Morrison's third-place finish.

After taking office, with a projected $2.4 billion deficit, Weicker reversed himself and pushed for the adoption of an income tax, a move that was very unpopular. He stated, "My policy when I came in was no income tax, but that fell apart on the rocks of fiscal fact." Weicker vetoed three budgets that did not contain an income tax, and forced a partial government shutdown, before the General Assembly narrowly passed it in 1991. The 1991 budget set the income tax rate at 6%, lowered the sales tax from 8% to 6% while expanding its base, reduced the corporate tax to 10.5% over two years, and eliminated taxes on capital gains, interest, and dividends. It also included $1.2 billion in line-by-line budget cuts, including the elimination of state aid to private and parochial schools, but held the line on social programs. His drastic measures provoked controversy. A huge protest rally in Hartford attracted some 40,000 participants, some of whom cursed at and spat at Governor Weicker. The Assembly attempted to pass a measure repealing the broad-based income tax, which he vetoed, and the override of a veto fell one vote short.

Weicker earned lasting criticism for his implementation of the income tax; the conservative Yankee Institute claimed in August 2006 that after fifteen years the income tax had failed to achieve its stated goals. However, he earned national attention for his leadership on the issue, receiving the John F. Kennedy Library Foundation's Profile in Courage Award for taking an unpopular stand, then holding firm. Within two years, the state's budget was in surplus and he was well-regarded among voters. In retirement, he commented, "You've had 19 years to repeal it, and all you've done is spend it."

Despite his popularity, he did not seek re-election as governor in 1994, citing wanting to spend time with his children as the reason. His last year in office was marked by a controversy over the firing of the state commissioner of motor vehicles, Louis Goldberg. In 2000, he endorsed Senator Bill Bradley (D-NJ) for President. In 2004, Weicker supported former Vermont Gov. Howard Dean's (D-VT) presidential bid. He expressed sympathy for the budget struggles of Governor Dannel Malloy, drawing a parallel with his own efforts to remedy a fiscal crisis.

In his book Independent Nation (2004), political analyst John Avlon describes Weicker as a radical centrist governor and thinker.

2006 candidacy for Senate

Lowell Weicker was said to be considering a rematch against Senator Joe Lieberman in the 2006 election cycle.  He objected to Lieberman's support for the Iraq War and noted in a New York Times article published on December 6, 2005, "If he's out there scot-free and nobody will do it [run against Senator Lieberman], I'd have to give serious thought to doing it myself, and I don't want to do it."

The Lieberman campaign released an ad that borrowed from one aired during the 1988 Senate race, which depicted Weicker as a hibernating bear ignoring his Senate duties except at election time. In the 2006 ad, Weicker reappeared as a wounded bear while Lieberman's Democratic challenger, Ned Lamont, was depicted as a bear cub sent and directed by Weicker. On June 18, 2006, Weicker held a fundraiser for Lamont and described himself as an "anti-war activist."  (Lamont won the primary, but Lieberman, running as an independent with heavy Republican support, maintained his seat in the general election.)

Post-government
In 1996, Weicker joined the Board of Directors for Compuware and still holds this position. In 1999, Weicker became a member of the Board of Directors for the World Wrestling Federation (now known as WWE), and held this position until 2011. Despite the long professional relationship, Weicker did not support former WWE CEO Linda McMahon in either of her unsuccessful bids for the U.S. Senate in 2010 or 2012.

Weicker served from 2001–2011 as President of the Board of Directors of Trust for America's Health, a Washington, DC-based non-profit, non-partisan health policy research organization, and formerly a member of the Board of Directors of United States Tobacco. Since 2003, Weicker has served on the board of Medallion Financial Corp., a lender to purchasers of taxi medallions in leading cities across the U.S. He was named to the board through his personal and business relationship with Andrew M. Murstein, president of Medallion.

During the 2016 Republican primaries, Weicker wrote an editorial in the Hartford Courant in which he criticized the repudiation of Rockefeller Republicans, the party's alienation of various population groups, and its obstructionist stance in Congress. He stated that the selection of Donald Trump as their presidential candidate "will complete their slow and steady descent into irrelevance."

In 2020, he filed an amicus brief on the side of Pennsylvania in the notable election case Texas v. Pennsylvania. Pennsylvania won the case and Biden was sworn in shortly after. Weicker had served with Biden in the Senate for 16 years before he was voted out.

See also
 Obama Republican
 Profile in Courage Award
 Rockefeller Republican
 List of U.S. state governors born outside the United States

References

Further reading
 Barone, Michael, et al. The Almanac of American Politics 1976: The Senators, the Representatives and the Governors: Their Records and Election Results, Their States and Districts (1975); new editions every 2 years through the 1996 editions cover his political career
 Lowell Weicker's papers are held at the Albert and Shirley Small Special Collections Library at the University of Virginia

External links

Biographical Directory of the United States Congress entry

1931 births
Living people
American anti–Iraq War activists
Connecticut local politicians
Governors of Connecticut
American people of German descent
Radical centrist writers
Republican Party United States senators from Connecticut
United States Army officers
University of Virginia School of Law alumni
Yale University alumni
Independent state governors of the United States
Connecticut Independents
Republican Party members of the United States House of Representatives from Connecticut
Lawrenceville School alumni
Military personnel from Connecticut
Watergate scandal investigators
Candidates in the 1980 United States presidential election
A Connecticut Party politicians